"El Scorcho" is a song by the American alternative rock band Weezer. It is the first single from the band's second album, Pinkerton, released in 1996. The music video features the band playing in an old ballroom in Los Angeles (as revealed by Weezer's Video Capture Device DVD), surrounded by light fixtures of diverse origin, flashing in time to the music. The name of the song supposedly came from a packet of hot sauce from Del Taco, labeled "Del Scorcho".

The track failed commercially; several radio stations refused to play the song, and the video was not played on MTV. This is considered to be one of the causes for the initial commercial failure of the album.

It was, however, extremely popular in Australia, and made it to #9 on the Triple J Hottest 100 chart, the national poll conducted by alternative rock station Triple J for the year's most popular alternative songs. It was subsequently released on the 1996 Triple J Hottest 100 compilation.

The song is available as a downloadable track for the video game series Rock Band.

Inspiration
Lead singer Rivers Cuomo mentioned in a 2006 interview with the Harvard college newspaper, The Crimson, that the lines mentioning "Cio-Cio San" and "watching Grunge leg-drop New Jack" were actually taken from an essay from a classmate of his at Harvard in an Expository Writing class. The printed lyrics to the song identify these two lines as quoted with the enclosure of quotation marks. "...one example is, in 'Pinkerton,' in 'El Scorcho,' two lines in the song are actually taken from someone else’s essay in my Expos class. Because at one point, we had to do a little workshop thing, and we each got assigned to review someone else’s essay. So, I reviewed this one person’s essay, and I liked some of the lines in it, so I took them and used them in the song." The actual meaning of "watching Grunge leg-drop New Jack through a press table" is a reference to ECW wrestler Johnny Grunge leg dropping New Jack, through a table, possibly referencing a photograph of Grunge wrestling New Jack that was published in Pro Wrestling Illustrated - in addition, grunge and new jack swing are two genres of popular music that rose to prominence in the late 1980s and early 1990s.

Cultural references
The line "listening to Cio-Cio San" is in reference to Puccini's opera, Madame Butterfly, The main characters of which are an American sailor—Pinkerton—and a Japanese girl named Cio-Cio San. The singer who played Cio-Cio San at the opera's premiere in 1904 was named Rosina Storchio, though the alternate spelling indicates that this is likely an unintentional reference.  This, in conjunction with the song "Pink Triangle", and the continued reference to the opera gives the album an overarching theme.  Additionally, the line "I'm the epitome/of public enemy" is a lyric from Public Enemy's "Don't Believe the Hype". The first line of the song has been mistakenly thought to refer to punk band Half Japanese.

Lyric changes
The song also mentions the band Green Day in the lyric "I asked you to go to the Green Day concert/You said you never heard of them." In 2005, Weezer often changed the lyric to "I asked you go to the Foo Fighters concert" while on the Foozer tour; and changed it to "the Weezer concert" later the same year. During their stop in Chicago for Lollapalooza, this was again changed to "I asked you to go to the Pixies concert" (a line that was also used in the 2019 tour with them), who were playing just before Weezer on a nearby stage; and at the Panic! at the Disco and Weezer 2016 Summer Tour, the line was sung "I asked you to go to the Panic concert".

Music video
For the single, Cuomo refused to make any "Buddy Holly"-like videos explaining "I really want the songs to come across untainted this time around...I really want to communicate my feelings  directly and because I was so careful in writing that way. I'd hate for the video to kinda misrepresent the song, or exaggerate certain aspects." The final video featured the band playing in an assembly hall in Los Angeles, surrounded by light fixtures of diverse origin, flashing in time to the music. Matt Sharp appears wearing a FC Barcelona shirt. At the beginning of the video, a neon sign reads "Weerez", although at the end, it reads Weezer. It debuted on MTV's program 120 Minutes and only received moderate airplay on the channel. Mark Romanek directed the video. Patrick Wilson was critical of the video, calling it a "lame concept" and saying too much money was spent on it.

Track listing
UK 7" Single/UK CD #1
"El Scorcho" – 4:03
"You Gave Your Love to Me Softly" – 1:57

UK CD #2
"El Scorcho" – 4:03
"You Gave Your Love to Me Softly" – 1:57
"Devotion" – 3:11

AU CD
"El Scorcho" – 4:03
"You Gave Your Love to Me Softly" – 1:57
"Devotion" – 3:11

"You Gave Your Love to Me Softly" was recorded for and released on the soundtrack to the film Angus. This version is a completely new recording.

Personnel
Rivers Cuomo – lead vocals, rhythm and acoustic guitars, organ
Patrick Wilson – drums, percussion
Brian Bell – lead guitar, backing vocals
Matt Sharp – bass guitar, backing vocals

Charts

Covers
Actor Michael Cera's band The Long Goodbye has covered the song.
Manchester Orchestra recorded a cover of it for their podcast series.
Chilean band Los Miserables in their album "Date Cuenta" made a cover called "Chow Chow Sen" inspired by the song El Scorcho.
 The Stereo also covered the song on the Weezer tribute album Rock Music: A Tribute to Weezer.
Mashup artists The Hood Internet paired the song with Drake's single "Best I Ever Had" to create the mashup entitled "El Besto I Ever Had".
The band  Brand New covered this song in Philadelphia, PA in July 2009.
Punk/indie rock band Titus Andronicus have covered the song multiple times on tour; the band included one of these live covers on their mixtape, Titus Andronicus LLC Mixtape Vol 1.
Dashboard Confessional covered this song for their album The Wire Tapes Vol. 1.
Deftones have also covered this song in live performances.
Wakey Wakey covered this song for a Pinkerton tribute album.

References

External links

Weezer songs
1996 singles
Music videos directed by Mark Romanek
Songs written by Rivers Cuomo
1996 songs
Rap rock songs
Post-grunge songs